Daniel Frick (born 19 June 1978) is a retired Liechtenstein football striker.

References

1978 births
Living people
Liechtenstein footballers
FC Balzers players
Association football forwards
Liechtenstein international footballers